Jagardoo: Poems from Aboriginal Australia, published in 1978,  is the second collection of poems by Noongar playwright and poet Jack Davis, often referred to as the 20th Century's Aboriginal Poet Laureate.

References 
Angshuman Kar, "Where To?: An Indian Perspective on Australian Aboriginal Poetry in English," Antipodes (Brooklyn, New York, N.Y.), 2014-12-01, Vol.28 (2), p.367-378.

John Ryan, "'No More Boomerang': Environment and Technology in Contemporary Aboriginal Australian Poetry," Humanities (Basel), Vol. 4  No. 4 (Dec. 2015): 938-957. 

Books about Indigenous Australians
Australian poetry